The 1947 World Table Tennis Championships mixed doubles was the 14th edition of the mixed doubles championship.  

Ferenc Soos and Gizi Farkas defeated Adolf Šlár and Vlasta Depetrisová in the final by three sets to one.

Results

See also
 List of World Table Tennis Championships medalists

References

-